Androstenediol acetate may refer to:

 Androstenediol 3β-acetate
 Androstenediol 17β-acetate
 Androstenediol 3β,17β-diacetate